Pachnistis is a genus of moths in the family Autostichidae.

Species
The species of this genus are:

Pachnistis arens Meyrick, 1913 (India)
Pachnistis cephalochra Meyrick, 1907 (Bhutan, India)
Pachnistis craniota (Meyrick, 1913) (South Africa)
Pachnistis cremnobathra Meyrick, 1922 (Java)
Pachnistis fulvocapitella Legrand, 1966 (Seychelles)
Pachnistis inhonesta Meyrick, 1916 (India)
Pachnistis morologa Meyrick, 1923 (Angola)
Pachnistis nigropunctella Viette, 1955 (Madagascar)
Pachnistis nubivaga Meyrick, 1921 (Celebes)
Pachnistis phaeoptila Bradley, 1961 (Java)
Pachnistis silens Meyrick, 1935 (Taiwan)

References

De Prins, J. & De Prins, W. 2014. Afromoths, online database of Afrotropical moth species (Lepidoptera). World Wide Web electronic publication (www.afromoths.net) (17-Jun-2014

 
Autostichinae